The 1955 Úrvalsdeild was the 44th season of league football in Iceland. KR won their 15th title. This was the first season that a team got relegated from the division, and Þróttur was the first team to drop down to the 2. deild karla. ÍA's Ríkharður Jónsson, Þórður Jónsson and Þórður Þórðarson were the joint top scorers with 7 goals.

League standings

Results

References

Úrvalsdeild karla (football) seasons
Iceland
Iceland
Urvalsdeild